Mohamed Ali Hassan, also known as Sheikh Mohamed Shakir Ali Hassan, was the Chief minister of Galmudug. He was Appointed on 6 December 2017 after a powersharing deal between Galmudug and Ahlu Sunna Waljama'a.

Chief minister
The chief minister presided over the state cabinet sessions but did not have the power to appoint or sack ministers. The President appointed the state ministers then forwarded it to the chief minister who then presented the names to the state assembly. The agreement also gave the president powers to sack the chief minister.

See also
Somalia
Politics of Somalia
Lists of office-holders
List of current heads of state and government

References

Galmudug
Somalian politicians
Living people
1974 births
People from Dusmareb